Smallwood Township is one of eleven townships in Jasper County, Illinois, USA.  As of the 2010 census, its population was 411 and it contained 165 housing units.

Geography

Unincorporated towns
 Bogota at 
 Shamrock at 
(This list is based on USGS data and may include former settlements.)

Adjacent townships
 Wade Township (north)
 Fox Township (east)
 Preston Township, Richland County (southeast)
 Denver Township, Richland County (south)
 Pixley Township, Clay County (southwest)
 South Muddy Township (west)
 North Muddy Township (northwest)

Cemeteries
The township contains these seven cemeteries: Cummins, Hankins, Honey, Lancaster, Pleasant Ridge, Tate and Woods.

Airports and landing strips
 Jasper County Flying Club Airport

Lakes
 Berry Lake

Demographics

School districts
 Jasper County Community Unit School District 1

Political districts
 Illinois' 19th congressional district
 State House District 108
 State Senate District 54

References
 
 United States Census Bureau 2007 TIGER/Line Shapefiles
 United States National Atlas

External links
 City-Data.com
 Illinois State Archives

Townships in Jasper County, Illinois
1859 establishments in Illinois
Populated places established in 1859
Townships in Illinois